Viviana is a female given name, and may refer to:

 Viviana (film), a 1916 American film
 Viviana (telenovela), a 1978 Mexican telenovela
 Saint Bibiana, or Viviana, 4th-century Roman martyr
 Viviana (given name)

See also
 
 Bibiana (disambiguation), a variant of the name
 Vivian (given name), a variant of the name
 Vivien (disambiguation), a variant of the name
 Vivienne, a variant of the name
 Saint Vibiana, 3rd-century Roman martyr
 Acraea viviana, butterfly